Notonykia nesisi is a species of squid in the family Onychoteuthidae. It is differentiated from Notonykia africanae by the shape of the tentacles. While the species is only known from immature specimens, it is known to achieve a mantle length of at least 100 mm. The tentacles are about 65-115% of the mantle length, and contain 6-18 hooks.

References

External links
 Tree of Life web project: Notonykia nesisi

Squid
Molluscs described in 2007